The Netherlands Reformed Congregations is a conservative Calvinist denomination with congregations in Canada, the United States and Bolivia.
It is affiliated with the Reformed Congregations in the Netherlands.

The Netherlands Reformed Congregations aim to remain true to inerrant Scripture (the Bible) and its Calvinist heritage as expounded in the denomination’s doctrinal standards: Belgic Confession, Heidelberg Catechism, and Canons of Dort. They are also in agreement with the Westminster Standards.

Basic beliefs and doctrines

Baptism
The Netherlands Reformed Congregations hold to infant baptism but believe that although being baptized, each child still carries the personal necessity of being born again by the inward work of the Holy Spirit. Baptism places a child into an external (or outward) relationship to the covenant of grace, just as the Israelites who passed through the Red Sea were outwardly part of God's covenant people. Like the Israelites, baptized children have many of the outward benefits of the children of God. Until they are regenerated by the Holy Spirit, however, they remain outside of the saving benefits of covenant of grace.

Bible version
The church services are conducted using exclusively the Authorised Version (King James) of the Bible, but personal use of other Bible translations for comparison is permitted. Almost all of the songs sung during the worship service are based on the book of Psalms.

Worship and liturgical forms
In keeping with the Dutch Calvinist traditions, most of the liturgical forms used are translations of the Dutch forms edited by Petrus Dathenus (1531–1588) and used during Reformation times. Most of the member churches have services two or three times per Sunday. The topic for one service per week is based on one of the 52 Lord's Days from The Heidelberg Catechism. The worship starts with a prayer, followed by singing of a Psalm. In addition to reading a part of the Scripture, the 10 Commandments are read during the Sunday morning service and the Apostles' Creed is read during the Sunday evening service. The pastor or an elder then prays with, and on behalf of the congregation. Following the prayer and the singing of a song adapted from the Psalms, the pastor delivers (preaches) the sermon. After the sermon, there is a closing prayer and more singing from the Psalter. The worship service ends with the pastor pronouncing the prayer for divine blessing from God upon the congregation, usually in the words of Numbers 6:24–26. During worship the congregation remains silent and respectful. Women wear headcoverings in accordance with 1 Corinthians 11. The intention of preaching a topical sermon guided by the Heidelberg Catechism is so that each of the various doctrines taught within Scripture will be covered at least once every year. The Netherlands Reformed Church recognizes two Sacraments: Holy Baptism and Lord's Supper. Children of members are usually baptized in the weeks or months following birth. The Lord's Supper, on the other hand, is usually held about four or five times per year although this may vary among individual churches. Only members who are (1) truly repentant for their sins, (2) have fled to Jesus Christ for salvation, and (3) are purposed from the heart to live in true thankfulness to God, are welcome to participate.

Creeds and confessions 
The church subscribes to the Three Forms of Unity, which are as follows:
 Belgic Confession of Faith (1561)
 Heidelberg Catechism (1563)
 Canons of Dort (1618/19)
The church adheres to the five Solae of the Protestant Reformation.
Scripture alone
Faith alone
Grace alone
Christ alone
Glory to God alone

History

Before emigration to North America

This church originated in the 1834 Dutch Reformed Church split, when a small group in the Netherlands called the Reformed Congregations (Gereformeerde Gemeenten) broke away from the state church.

Emigration to North America
Distancing themselves from their fellow secessionists of Albertus van Raalte and his associates Cornelius Vander Meulen and Hendrik Scholte due to doctrinal disputes, they led their own emigration first to South Holland, Illinois, in 1865 and then to Grand Rapids, Michigan, in 1870.

Post emigration

1972 status
In 1972, there were fourteen Netherlands Reformed Congregations in the United States, most still conducting their services half in Dutch and half in English, with over five thousand members.

1993 church split

In 1993, there was a split in the Netherlands Reformed Congregations resulting in a new denomination by Joel Beeke called the Heritage Netherlands Reformed Congregations, which was renamed the Heritage Reformed Congregations in 2005. The two denominations, although split, continue to co-operate with the running of schools founded by the NRC.

As of 2008, the Heritage Reformed Congregations has five churches in the United States and five in Canada. The denomination is one of the "governing denominations" of the Puritan Reformed Theological Seminary.

Current status
In 2001, there were 26 churches and 9,395 members in Canada and the United States. In 2016, the church has 27 congregations and 11,172 members. Currently, there are three Classis. In Bolivia, there are congregations in Rincon, Santa Cruz and Loma Alta.

Statistics 
The NRC consists of these congregations:

Recent status
The Netherlands Reformed Congregations in North America continue to have close relations with their sister churches (the Reformed Congregations) in the Netherlands.  The church services in North America are now mostly conducted in the English language, with some services still in the Dutch language.

Mission fields
The Netherlands Reformed Congregations is involved in mission work in the Loma Alta, Santa Cruz, and Tarija areas of Bolivia.

Education

Sunday school and Catechism classes
In general the churches hold Sunday School and Catechism classes for the youth of the congregation. These classes may be held after the Sunday morning service.

Elementary/high schools
Netherlands Reformed Christian Educational Association consists of twelve schools throughout the United States and Canada, with 3,358 students as of the 2016–2017 school year.

Publications

Magazines and articles
 The Banner of Truth – A monthly publication of the denomination
 Insight Into – The official publication for the youth of the denomination
 Paul – Bimonthly magazine published by the denominational Mission Board
 Learning and Living – The official publication of the Netherlands Reformed Christian Educator's Association

Books
 Treasured Meditations – Prints and reprints of sermons, tracts, and other spiritual literature

See also
 Reformed Congregations
 Nigeria Reformed Church
 Gereja Jemaat Protestan di Indonesia
 Puritan Reformed Theological Seminary

External links 
 Website Netherlands Reformed Congregations

References 

Reformed denominations in the United States
Religious organizations established in 1830
Calvinist denominations established in the 19th century
1830 establishments in the Netherlands